Imperium refers to a legal concept of authority in Roman antiquity

Imperium may also refer to:
the authority of an imperator, as a special class of official in the Roman Republic
during the Roman Empire, the authority of the Roman emperors
Imperium Romanum, the Roman Empire
Imperium Romanum Sacrum, the Holy Roman Empire
any Empire

Film and television
Imperium (film series), TV movie series on the Julio-Claudian Dynasty
Imperium (TV series), 2012 Spanish TV series
Imperium (2016 film), film starring Daniel Radcliffe as an undercover FBI agent

Games
Imperium (board game), a science fiction board wargame
Imperium: Third Millennium, a new edition of the Imperium board game 
Imperium (Warhammer 40,000), a galactic empire in the fictional Warhammer 40,000 universe
Imperium (Traveller), a galactic empire in the fictional Traveller role-playing game universe
Imperium (1990 video game), developed by Electronic Arts for the Amiga, Atari ST and DOS
Imperium (1992 video game), developed by Vic Tokai for the Super NES/Super Famicom system

Literature
Imperium (Harris novel), a 2006 novel by Robert Harris
Imperium (play cycle), 2017 theatre adaptation of the novel and its two sequels
Imperium (Kapuściński book), a 1993 book by Ryszard Kapuściński
Imperium (Kracht novel), a 2012 novel by Christian Kracht
Imperium: The Philosophy of History and Politics, a 1947 book by Francis Parker Yockey (using the pen name Ulick Varange)
The Imperium, a fictional race in the novel Worlds of the Imperium by Keith Laumer

Music
Imperium (Current 93 album)
Imperium (Blouse album), 2013 
Imperium (Hunter album), 2013
"Imperium" (Madeon song), 2014
"Imperium" (Machine Head song)

Other uses
Imperium, play by the Austrian writer and director Götz Spielmann
Imperium (professional wrestling), a professional wrestling stable in WWE

See also
 Empire (disambiguation)